swisspeace is a practice-oriented peace research institute located in Basel, Switzerland. It aims to contribute to the improvement of conflict prevention and conflict transformation by supporting Swiss and international actors in their peacebuilding activities.

History

swisspeace was founded in 1988 as the Swiss Peace Foundation with the goal of strengthening independent peace research in Switzerland. Today swisspeace employs approximately fifty people and is headquartered in Basel, Switzerland.
swisspeace is a member of the Swiss Academy of Humanities and Social Sciences (SAHS) and is an associated Institute of the University of Basel.
Jakob Kellenberger, former president of the International Committee of the Red Cross (ICRC), became president of swisspeace on the organization’s 25th anniversary on 10 September 2013. Professor Laurent Goetschel is the director of swisspeace.

Donors and clients 
The most important donors and clients are the Swiss Federal Department of Foreign Affairs (FDFA), the Swiss National Science Foundation (SNSF), State Secretariat for Education, Research and Innovation (SERI)  as well as national and international organizations, foundations and think tanks.

Fields of expertise 
swisspeace aims to shape and help implement the Swiss government‘s peace and security policy through research, training, advisory services and information sharing. It cooperates with other organizations and has the capacity to found new organizations. The Foundation focuses on the following subjects:

Mediation
Third parties can play an important role in establishing dialogue between warring parties. In collaboration with the Center for Security Studies (CSS), ETH Zurich, Swisspeace advises peace mediators of the Swiss Federal Department of Foreign Affairs (FDFA) and offers annual training courses on the subject of peace mediation. The Foundation currently also works with UN Women on the participation of women in the peace process and on minority issues in Myanmar.

Peacebuilding analysis and impact
The peaceful resolution of armed conflicts requires thorough analysis of the respective conflict and the actors involved. In this field, swisspeace currently runs a reintegration project for public servants in Gaza to support the reconciliation between Hamas and Fatah.

Dealing with the past

Violent conflicts, dictatorships and repressive regimes often have a lasting impact on societies. Dealing with the legacy of human rights violations and other crimes, also called transitional justice has thus become a central topic for swisspeace. The Foundation seeks to pursue a holistic approach that was jointly developed with the Swiss Federal Department of Foreign Affairs (FDFA). This approach has four pillars: the right to know; the right to justice; the right to reparation; and the guarantee of non-recurrence (see Figure 1). Since the creation of the Truth and Dignity Commission (TDC) in Tunisia in 2014, swisspeace has advised the TDC in questions regarding the access to state archives.

Statehood and conflict
Whether state institutions can function properly once an armed conflict has ended often depends on the history and the dynamics of the conflict. In this field, the focus of swisspeace’s activities lies on state-building, democracy and traditional authorities for example in South Sudan.

Business and peace
Private companies can play a critical role in conflict-ridden areas. Against this background, swisspeace offers companies assistance in identifying conflict-related risks of their operations and in adapting their business practices accordingly. For example, swisspeace developed a manual for conflict prevention and resolution for the logging company Danzer after tensions with the local population had escalated in the Democratic Republic of Congo.

Gender
Conflicts affect women, children and men in different ways. To take these differences into account, swisspeace has sought to promote the implementation of the UN Security Council Resolution 1325 on women, peace and security.

Postgraduate courses
swisspeace offers postgraduate education programs and courses in the peacebuilding field. As associated Institute of the University of Basel, swisspeace offers the following programs:
 Annual and modular Certificates of Advanced Studies (CAS) in Civilian Peacebuilding 
 Diploma of Advanced Studies (DAS) in Civilian Peacebuilding (30 ECTS)
 Master of Advanced Studies (MAS) in Civilian Peacebuilding (60 ECTS)

Projects

Basel Peace Forum
In 2016 swisspeace launched as a new project the Basel Peace Forum. It organizes an annual conference uniting representatives from economics, politics, science and society to think about peace and to further innovation in peacebuilding.

KOFF platform
In 2001, swisspeace founded the Center for Peacebuilding (KOFF) to provide a dialogue, exchange and networking platform for Swiss state and non-state actors that are engaged in peacebuilding activities. Its director between 2001 and 2003 was international peace process expert Thania Paffenholz. Currently, KOFF is headed by Sidonia Gabriel.

OSCE
During Switzerland’s Chairmanship of the Organization for Security and Co-operation in Europe (OSCE) in 2014, swisspeace organized events and engaged in several projects on the subject of peace in the OSCE region. Among other events, the Foundation organized the 2014 OSCE Parallel Civil Society Conference in Basel which took place at the same time as the OSCE Ministerial Council meeting.

References
Much of the content of this article comes from the equivalent German-language Wikipedia article. Retrieved on 5 August 2015. Many of the following references are cited by that German-language article:

External links 
Official Website swisspeace
Official Website KOFF
Official Website Basel Peace Forum

Foreign policy and strategy think tanks
Think tanks established in 1988
Think tanks based in Switzerland
Organisations based in Bern
Peace organisations based in Switzerland